Dorota Borowska (born 22 February 1996) is a Polish sprint canoeist.

She participated at the 2018 ICF Canoe Sprint World Championships.

References

External links

1996 births
Living people
Polish female canoeists
ICF Canoe Sprint World Championships medalists in Canadian
Canoeists at the 2019 European Games
European Games medalists in canoeing
European Games bronze medalists for Poland
Olympic canoeists of Poland
Canoeists at the 2020 Summer Olympics
People from Nowy Dwór Mazowiecki
21st-century Polish women